Hareby is a small village in the East Lindsey district of Lincolnshire, England. A former civil parish, Hareby is now in the parish of Bolingbroke. 

The village is listed in the 1086 Domesday Book. Hareby is now considered a deserted medieval village, and earthworks can be seen south from the church.

The parish church sits on Hareby Hill and is dedicated to Saint Peter and Saint Paul; it is a Grade II listed building of greenstone and red brick. The present church dates from 1858, although it reuses details dating from the 14th century. The font dates from the 17th century.

The church is the setting for a famous scene in Calamy's history of nonconformist ministers. John Horne, who had been ejected from his benefice at Lynn in 1662, preached one day at Hareby. Three sisters in the congregation discussed his merits and the youngest said 'she would think herself happy if she might have such a man, though she begged her bread with him.' This information was soon passed to Rev Horne, who married her. Presumably they had to then beg since he had no benefice income to provide for his new family although he did gain some Church of England jobs from 1673.

The Millennium Dome near the church is a small gazebo with views from Hareby Hill.

References

External links

"Hareby", Genuki.org.uk. Retrieved 17 August 2011

Villages in Lincolnshire
East Lindsey District
Former civil parishes in Lincolnshire